The Devil to Pay!  is a 1930 American pre-Code romantic drama film directed by George Fitzmaurice and starring Ronald Colman, Frederick Kerr, Myrna Loy, and Loretta Young. It was written by Frederick Lonsdale and Benjamin Glazer.

Plot
After selling his house and belongings in East Africa, upper-class black sheep Willie Hale (Colman) returns home to England, where he buys a dog with most of his remaining money. Lord Leeland (Kerr), his wealthy father, is furious and insists to Susan and Arthur, his other adult offspring, that he will kick his wayward son out if he dares show his face, seeing as he has given Willie ten starts in life already. However, when Willie does show up, the old man gives him £100 spending money instead.

After seeing his old girlfriend, theatre star Mary Crayle (Loy), Willie meets family friend and heiress Dorothy Hope (Young). He takes Dorothy and Susan to the Derby, where he and Dorothy have a wonderful time (and he wins a great deal of money betting on a 50-1 longshot). Dorothy then breaks her engagement to Grand Duke Paul (Cavanagh) because she finds bankrupt Willie far more charming.

Willie is reluctant to get involved with her, but when her father insists he will disinherit her if she marries Willie, he promptly proposes to her. She accepts, on condition that he promise to never see Mary ever again. Willie is unable to break the news to Mary by letter or telephone call, so he waits for her outside the theatre. She insists he come home with her, where he is finally able to tell her about his engagement. However, Mr. Hope gets Dorothy to agree to break up with Willie if he breaks his promise. He then hires a detective agency to watch the young man. He has Dorothy call Mary on the telephone. When Willie answers, she is heartbroken.

When Willie goes to try to explain himself, Dorothy pays him £5000 for the bitter "experience", assuming that he was merely after her inheritance. She is astonished when he walks off with the check, whistling. Willie has no intention of keeping the money. After he hears that Paul is actually destitute, he sends the full sum to the man under Dorothy's name. Paul gladly accepts it. Paul sends a note to Dorothy thanking her, delighting Dorothy and disillusioning her father. Dorothy and Willie make up before he sets sail for New Zealand to start a sheep farm. Much to Lord Leeland's delight, Dorothy's father offers to buy him a farm in England; if Willie fails this time, Dorothy's father will be footing the bill, not him.

Cast
Ronald Colman as Willie Hale
Frederick Kerr as Lord Leland
Loretta Young as Dorothy Hope
David Torrence as Mr Hope
Florence Britton as Susan Hale
Myrna Loy as Mary Crayle
Paul Cavanagh as Grand Duke Paul
Crauford Kent as Arthur

Production
Samuel Goldwyn recruited the playwright Frederick Lonsdale to write a British-set story after meeting him on a visit to London for the première of the Colman film Bulldog Drummond. Goldwyn saw it as an ideal vehicle for Colman to follow up his success in the previous film. Constance Cummings was originally cast in the female lead, but was replaced because her American accent was too strong for the British setting. Goldwyn also replaced the original director, Irving Cummings, after two weeks because he was unhappy with the standard of production.

References

Bibliography
 Berg, A. Scott Goldwyn: A Biography. Pan Books, 1999.

External links

1930 films
1930 romantic drama films
American romantic drama films
American black-and-white films
Films directed by George Fitzmaurice
Films set in England
Films set in London
Samuel Goldwyn Productions films
United Artists films
1930s English-language films
1930s American films